The 2005 Dutch Open in badminton was held in Den Bosch, Netherlands, from October 12, 2005 to October 16, 2005.

Results

External links
Official website
toernooi.nl: Yonex Dutch Open 2005 Results

Dutch Open (badminton)
Dutch Open
Open